Didymoglossum melanopus is a species of fern in the family Hymenophyllaceae. It is endemic to Ecuador.

The genus Didymoglossum is accepted in the Pteridophyte Phylogeny Group classification of 2016 (PPG I), but not by some other sources. , Plants of the World Online merged the genus into a broadly defined Trichomanes, treating this species as Trichomanes melanopus.

References

Hymenophyllales
Ferns of Ecuador
Endemic flora of Ecuador
Taxonomy articles created by Polbot
Taxobox binomials not recognized by IUCN